Tôn (孙) (Anglicised as Ton) is a Vietnamese surname. It is transliterated as Sun in Chinese and Son in Korean.

Notable people
Tôn Đức Thắng (1888–1980), first President of the Socialist Republic of Vietnam
Tôn Hiếu Anh, Vietnamese male model

See also
Tôn Thất, a Vietnamese compound surname
Nguyễn Văn Tồn (1763–1820), Vietnamese general
Phạm Duy Tốn (1881–1924), Vietnamese writer
Trương Ngọc Tơn (born 1960), Vietnamese swimmer

Vietnamese-language surnames
vi:Tôn (họ)